Coming Home is a 1998 British serial directed by Giles Foster. The teleplay by John Goldsmith is based on the 1995 novel of the same name by Rosamunde Pilcher. Produced by Yorkshire Television, it was broadcast in two parts by ITV from 12 to 13 April 1998.

Plot 
The story focuses on Judith Dunbar, who is enrolled in St. Ursula's, an English boarding school, when her parents and younger sister move to colonial Singapore. She is introduced to a world of wealth and privilege by her classmate, Loveday Carey-Lewis, whose family owns the magnificent Cornwall estate known as Nancherrow. Although Judith enjoys the company of her doting Aunt Louise, who has been named her legal guardian during her parents' absence, she prefers to spend as much of her school holidays as possible with Loveday's parents and siblings, who welcome her as one of their own. When Aunt Louise is killed in an automobile accident, she leaves her considerable estate to Judith, who will be independently wealthy for life if she handles her inheritance wisely.

Judith becomes increasingly attracted to Loveday's older brother Edward and eventually succumbs to his gentle seduction. When she realizes she was foolishly naive to think he was committed to a permanent relationship, she departs Nancherrow and enlists in the Royal Navy at the onset of World War II. The ensuing years wreak havoc on her life and those of the people she loves. Edward, blinded in battle, returns home and commits suicide rather than be a burden to others. When Loveday's fiancé Gus goes missing in action she fears he is dead. As there is no news concerning his fate, she believes he is dead. Later she becomes
pregnant and agrees to marry her friend Walter. Judith reunites with Carey-Lewis family friend Jeremy Wells, a doctor who has loved her since the day they met, but unexpected circumstances tear them apart. Further complications arise when Judith's sister Jess is placed in her care after the ship on which she and their mother were returning to England is bombed by the Japanese and Jess is placed in an internment camp. With their father missing and their mother lost at sea, Judith must learn to interact with a grieving young girl emotionally scarred by her wartime experiences.

Cast 
 Keira Knightley (Part 1) / Emily Mortimer (Part 2) as Judith Dunbar
 Peter O'Toole as Colonel Edgar Carey-Lewis
 Joanna Lumley as Diana Carey-Lewis
 Poppy Gaye as Young Loveday (Part 1) / Katie Ryder Richardson as Loveday Carey-Lewis (Part 2)
 Penelope Keith as Aunt Louise
 David McCallum as Billy Fawcett
 Paul Bettany as Edward Carey-Lewis
 George Asprey as Dr. Jeremy Wells
 Heikko Deutschmann as Gus
 Patrick Ryecart as Tommy Mortimer
 Susan Hampshire as Miss Catto
 Brooke Kinsella as Jess

Production 
The serial was shot at numerous locations in Cornwall, including Godrevy, Lamorna, Lelant, Marazion, Penzance, Porthgwarra, Prideaux Place, and St Michael's Mount, as well as Wrotham Park in Hertfordshire.

Home media 
Acorn Media UK released the serial in fullscreen format on DVD on 28 March 2000. It includes excerpts from a documentary about Rosamunde Pilcher.

External links 
 

1998 British television series debuts
1998 British television series endings
1990s British drama television series
1990s British television miniseries
Television shows based on British novels
ITV television dramas
Period television series
Television series by ITV Studios
Television series by Yorkshire Television
World War II television series
English-language television shows
Television shows set in England